Mount Wrather is a  mountain summit located in the Boundary Ranges, in the U.S. state of Alaska. Although modest in elevation, relief is significant since the mountain rises up from sea-level at Auke Bay in less than nine miles. The mountain's name was officially adopted in 1968 by the USGS to honor William Embry Wrather (1883–1963), the 6th Director of the United States Geological Survey from 1943 to 1956.

Climate

Based on the Köppen climate classification, Mount Wrather is located in a subarctic climate zone with cold, snowy winters, and mild summers. Temperatures can drop below −20 °C with wind chill factors below −30 °C. This climate supports the Mendenhall Glacier on its west aspect, and Juneau Icefield to the mountain's northeast. June and July are the best months for climbing in terms of catching favorable weather.

See also

List of mountain peaks of Alaska
Geography of Alaska
Bullard Mountain

References

External links
 Mount Wrather weather: NOAA Juneau, AK

Wrather
Wrather
Wrather
Wrather